Cheniménil is a commune in the Vosges department in Grand Est in northeastern France.

Notable people
 Emmanuelle Riva (1927-2017), French actress, born in Cheniménil

See also
 Communes of the Vosges department

References

Communes of Vosges (department)